Pleurotomella puella is a species of sea snail, a marine gastropod mollusk in the family Raphitomidae.

Description

Distribution
This marine species occurs in the Zanzibar Channel.

References

External links
 Thiele J., 1925. Gastropoden der Deutschen Tiefsee-Expedition. In:. Wissenschaftliche Ergebnisse der Deutschen Tiefsee-Expedition auf dem Dampfer "Valdivia" 1898–1899 II. Teil, vol. 17, No. 2, Gustav Fischer, Berlin
 

puella
Gastropods described in 1925